Plus Vivant is the sixth album by singer, songwriter and composer Lokua Kanza.

Track listing 
"Voir le jour" - 3:54
"Caméra dans le coeur" - 3:35
"Envie d'aventure" - 3:45
"Tu es l'infini" - 3:17
"Plus vivant" (with Corneille) - 3:35
"Aller simple pour l'infini" - 3:45
"Laisse-moi le temps" - 3:42
"Si tu pars" - 3:11
"Anticyclone" - 4:04
"A tes côtés" - 3:56
"La clé des champs" - 3:35
"Le monde est fou" - 3:36
"Mal à dire" - 4:20
"Piololo" - 0:33
"Plus vivant" - 3:38

2005 albums
French-language albums
Lokua Kanza albums